Sierra is a fictional character portrayed by Dichen Lachman in the Fox science fiction series Dollhouse, created by Joss Whedon. Within the series' narrative, Sierra is an "Active" or a "doll", one of a group of men and women who can be programmed with memories and skills to engage in particular assignments; in their default state, Actives are innocent, childlike and suggestible. Before having her memories wiped, Sierra's name was Priya Tsetsang. Although Sierra does not exhibit the same self-awareness that Echo has, she develops feelings such as love in her doll state.

Character

Before the Dollhouse
Prior to entering the Dollhouse, Priya Tsetsang is an Australian who is possibly travelling around the United States. During which time she visited Venice, Los Angeles, California and was selling bohemian artworks by the beachside.

In the Dollhouse
Sierra makes her first appearance in the pilot episode "Ghost" as the Dollhouse's newest Active.  She is seen, apparently in significant pain, as Topher Brink maps her body tissue in preparation for her imprinting. She reappears later in the same episode, imprinted with a military persona directed to forcefully extract Echo and a client from a hostage situation.

After this, Sierra is commonly deployed to assist Echo on engagements, while in their doll states the two begin to develop a connection.  The episode "Stage Fright" sees the beginning of a friendship emerging between the dolls.  The two are shown exercising together, and when Sierra stumbles Echo moves to help her, explaining, "I didn’t want you to get hurt. You're my friend." Sierra agrees that "friends help each other out". Later the two are imprinted and deployed on an engagement together, which goes badly wrong when Sierra is kidnapped.  Although the imprints have met only briefly, Echo shows great concern for Sierra. Apparently speaking of the client she insists that she "[has] to help her", but her words take on a double meaning as she is shown to be staring at a picture of Sierra.  In enacting her plan to rescue her fellow Active, Echo repeats Sierra's earlier remark, although her imprint ought not remember it: "Friends help each other out."

Sierra's friendship with both Echo and Victor become more apparent in subsequent episodes.  In "Gray Hour", Topher and Boyd Langton observe that the three dolls have developed the habit of eating lunch together at the same table every day.  Boyd wonders if they may be remembering each other, but Topher cites "herding instinct" and compares them to bison, flocking together in instinctual survival patterns that go deeper than memory.  Through "True Believer" and "Man on the Street" Sierra and Victor are shown to be developing a sexual attraction in their mind-wiped state.

In "Man on the Street", Sierra has an uncharacteristic outburst while in the Dollhouse, screaming in terror when Victor touches her shoulder from behind.  Further investigation finds that she has been crying in her sleeping pod each night, and a medical examination reveals that Sierra has had sexual intercourse while in the Dollhouse. The suspicion naturally falls on Victor, whose attraction to Sierra has not escaped the notice of the staff.  Ultimately, however, it emerges that Sierra's handler, Hearn, has been raping her in her doll state.  Hearn is apprehended and the traumas wiped from Sierra's mind, although later episodes she experiences flashbacks to the rape, demonstrating that the wipe was not entirely successful.

Background Story/Re-entering the Dollhouse
In the episode "Belonging", Sierra's past, and the story of how she came to be in the Dollhouse, is explored. It emerges that Sierra is an Australian artist called Priya Tsetsang, who sells her work by Venice Beach in Los Angeles.  In the course of this she meets Nolan Kinnard (first seen in "Needs"), a wealthy doctor who develops a fascination with both Priya and her artwork.  In an attempt to seduce Priya, Nolan commissions a large painting from her and arranges an elaborate showing of the finished artwork in his house.  To further impress her he employs the services of the Dollhouse, which sends Echo and Victor to the showing, both imprinted to enthuse about Nolan to Priya.  However, Priya is discomforted by the lavish party, and more interested in Victor than in Nolan.  She attempts to leave with Victor, which culminates in a confrontation with Nolan.  Rejecting his increasingly threatening advances, Priya leaves the party.

Some time later, the Los Angeles Dollhouse is searching for a new Active candidate and has located a young, apparently-paranoid schizophrenic woman who appears to meet their specifications. The woman is revealed to be Priya, and her debilitating mental condition has left her a patient in a psychiatric hospital run by Nolan. Upon meeting with Topher, Priya insists that she is a prisoner, having been kidnapped, tortured and poisoned in a plot to drive her crazy. Topher assumes these claims to be a part of her schizophrenic delusions, and Priya is brought to the LA Dollhouse to become the Active Sierra.

Topher is only driven to investigate Priya's history further after being confronted by Echo, who presents him with a painting of Sierra's dominated by a threatening black shape. Echo insists that Sierra is haunted by a "bad man".  When Topher re-examines Priya's original brain scan he discovers that it is not, as he had initially concluded, the brain of a paranoid schizophrenic, but rather that of a healthy brain suffering from the effects of misapplied anti-psychotic medication, inducing a psychotic state. Nolan, it emerges, had manufactured Priya's condition in order to create a pretext for sending her to the Dollhouse.  As an Active programmed to desire him, Priya cannot reject Nolan's advances, and since her entry into the Dollhouse he has been hiring her for frequent sexual engagements.

When Adelle DeWitt learns of this, she confronts Nolan, but he, having powerful connections within the Rossum Corporation, responds by demanding that he be given Sierra with a permanent imprint, lest he have DeWitt fired.  Left without a choice, DeWitt orders Topher to go through with the imprint, but Topher instead imprints Sierra with Priya's original personality.  Priya confronts Nolan and ultimately kills him in a heated exchange. Boyd and Topher help cover up the murder and Sierra re-enters the Dollhouse voluntarily, begging Topher, that when her body is returned to her, he withhold the memories of the murder.

Relationships

Victor
In the episode "True Believer" it comes to the attention of both Topher and Dr. Saunders that Victor is having erections. Upon further investigation, it is shown that Victor is actually attracted to Sierra. While being interviewed after Sierra was raped, Victor was asked how Sierra made him feel. He states that she makes him feel better.

Dr. Saunders has also observed Victor's feelings towards Sierra. During the self-fulfillment exercise Sierra needed to confront Nolan for putting her in the Dollhouse. Victor accompanies her. During their time together they remember details about their doll state. Sierra recalls how Victor always makes sure she is fine before they go to sleep in the pods. They swear to each to keep looking out for each other before sharing a kiss. Boyd wonders what Victor's self-fulfillment was. Dr. Saunders believes he loves her.

Sierra has seemingly reciprocated feelings towards Victor. In the closing scenes of the episode "Vows" they walk past each other and Sierra notices the scars on Victor's face are gone. They hold hands and walk off together.

Priya admits she is in love with Victor in the episode "Belonging." When Sierra was due for a treatment, Victor attempted to come with her, however Topher stops Victor and he waits for Sierra to return. Priya states to Nolan she is in love with someone she does not even know. Upon seeing Victor back in the Dollhouse, she asks Topher if the love is real. He says it is and that the feelings are mutual. After being wiped Sierra and Victor walk off holding hands and are eventually seen sleeping in a pod together.

In Epitaph 2: Return it is revealed that Priya and Victor have a child, "T", and she is furious over Victor's decision to leave them and become a Techhead. At the end they are a family once more and were last seen reading a story to T while waiting underground in the Los Angeles Dollhouse.

Echo
Echo first saw Sierra while Sierra was undergoing a tissue mapping procedure by Topher. Echo inquires about her pain but Topher implies they are helping her and she will have a new friend shortly.

Echo always seems to look out for Sierra. When Sierra was being raped by Hearn, she told Boyd that Sierra cries while she is in the Pod. Also, at the end of "Stage Fright", in order to protect Sierra, she shrugs off Sierra as she tries to greet her in the presence of Hearn. Echo was also the one to bring Nolan to the attention of Topher.

Topher has noted that Echo is "mother-hen about Sierra".

See also
 List of Dollhouse characters

References

Science fiction television characters
Characters created by Joss Whedon
Fictional Australian people
Fictional artists
Fictional slaves
Fictional prostitutes
Television characters introduced in 2009